Symeon (Middle Gaelic: Simón; fl. 1147  – 1155) is the second known Bishop of Ross in the 12th century. His predecessor Mac Bethad occurred as bishop in a document datable between 1127 and 1131.

Symeon appeared for the first time when he witnessed a charter by King David I of Scotland granting Nithbren and Balcristin to Dunfermline Abbey. This is the only extant charter witnessed by Bishop Symeon. This charter is also witnessed by Alwin, Abbot of Holyrood (Alwyno abbate de Edenb.,), who had resigned his abbacy in 1151, and by Herbert, Bishop of Glasgow, who was consecrated as bishop at Auxerre on 24 August 1147, meaning that the charter was issued and witnessed between these two dates.

A "S. Bishop of St Peter in Ross" was addressed by Pope Adrian IV in a Papal Bull issued on 25 February 1155. His date of death is not known, but fell between that date in 1155 and 1161, when his successor Gregoir was consecrated as bishop.

Notes

References
 Dowden, John, The Bishops of Scotland, ed. J. Maitland Thomson, (Glasgow, 1912)
 Keith, Robert, An Historical Catalogue of the Scottish Bishops: Down to the Year 1688, (London, 1924)
 Watt, D. E. R., Fasti Ecclesiae Scotinanae Medii Aevi ad annum 1638, 2nd Draft, (St Andrews, 1969)
  Watt, D. E. R.,& Shead, N.F. (eds.), The Heads of Religious Houses in Scotland from the 12th to the 16th Centuries, The Scottish Records Society, New Series, Volume 24, (Edinburgh, 2001)

12th-century deaths
12th-century Scottish Roman Catholic bishops
Bishops of Ross (Scotland)
Year of birth unknown